A living statue, also known as a human statue, usually refers to a performer who poses as a statue or mannequin, usually with realistic statue-like makeup.

Living statue may also refer to art installations created by an artist using living people, or other works created by a performing artist.

History 

The tableau vivant, or group of living statues, was a regular feature of medieval and Renaissance festivities and pageantry, such as royal entries by rulers into cities. Typically a group enacting a scene would be mounted on an elaborate stand decorated to look like a monument, placed on the route of the procession.

In the early years of the 20th century, the German dancer Olga Desmond put on "Evenings of Beauty" (Schönheitsabende), in which she posed nude in imitation of classical works of art ("living pictures").

A living statue appeared in a scene of the 1945 French film Les enfants du paradis (Children of Paradise). The London-based artists Gilbert and George created living statues in the 1960s.

Contemporary use
Contemporary performances are commonly on-the-street busking, but may also be at events where the artist is paid. A living statue attraction, as a performance, is the artist's ability to stand motionless and occasionally come to life to comic or startling effect. These performers, also known as human statues, are often completely covered in paint, often gold or silver in colour.

Australian artist Andrew Baines is known for his artworks using living people, often used to convey a social message.

Events 

Since 1996, the annual "World Statues Festival" is held in Arnhem, Netherlands, initially under the name "Rijnfestijn", now World Living Statues and Statues by Night.

The University of Business and Social Sciences in Buenos Aires, Argentina has hosted a National Contest of Living Statues since the year 2000.

Since 2011, the International Festival of Living Statues has been hosted by Masca Theatre in Bucharest, Romania, where there is a focus on developing the form through artistic research.

Gallery

See also 
Mannequin Challenge

References

External links 

"How to be a living statue" on WikiHow
Living/human statues on Busker Alley (living statues videos)

Performing arts
Street performance